Christian Kinsombi (born 24 August 1999) is a German professional footballer who plays as a left winger for SV Sandhausen.

Career
Kinsombi made his professional debut for KFC Uerdingen in the first round of the 2019–20 DFB-Pokal on 9 August 2019, coming on as a substitute in the 58th minute for Osayamen Osawe in the home match against Bundesliga side Borussia Dortmund.

Personal life
Kinsombi is of Democratic Republic of the Congo descent. His older brother David Kinsombi is also a professional footballer.

References

External links
 
 

1999 births
Living people
German footballers
German sportspeople of Democratic Republic of the Congo descent
Association football wingers
1. FSV Mainz 05 II players
KFC Uerdingen 05 players
SV Sandhausen players
3. Liga players
2. Bundesliga players
Regionalliga players